At the end of the 20th century there were a total of 270,000 Jews in the Chicago area, with 30% in the city limits. In 1995 there were 154,000 Jews in the suburbs of Chicago. Of them, over 80% of the Jews in the suburbs of Chicago live in the northern and northwestern suburbs. In 1995, the largest Jewish community in the City of Chicago was in West Rogers Park. By 1995 the Jewish population within the City of Chicago had been declining, and it tended to be older and more well educated than the Chicago average. Jews in Chicago came from many national origins including those in Europe and Middle East, with Eastern Europe and Germany being the most common.

History
Jews arrived in Chicago immediately after its 1833 incorporation. The Ashkenazi were the first Jewish group settling in Chicago. In the late 1830s and early 1840s a group of mostly Bavarian German Jews came to Chicago. On Yom Kippur 1845 the first Jewish religious service in Chicago was held. Many Jews peddled items on streets. They later opened small stores, which were the basis of several companies. In this time the Jewish community was constantly growing, and when the American Civil War began, the community itself recruited a company of 100 Jews to join the 82nd Regiment of Illinois Volunteers.

Most Jewish Chicagoans lived downtown until Great Chicago Fire. Starting in the 1870s, many moved to the South Side. The South Side Jewish community was initially centered in what is now known as Bronzeville. Eventually, Jews began moving forever south to lakefront neighborhoods such as Hyde Park, Kenwood, and South Shore.

Immigration from Eastern Europe
The first wave of Eastern European Jewish immigration, with many coming from shtetls in Poland and Russia, started in the 1870s. The Eastern European and German Jewish communities mostly remained separate until the mid-20th century due to different cultural and religious practices. The Eastern European Jews originally moved to the Maxwell Street area on the Near Westside, which at the time was one of the poorest areas of Chicago. Jews founded the legendary Maxwell Street Market and 40 synagogues in the area. Many of the Jews worked as artisans, workers in factories, peddlers, and petty merchants. The factory workers were primarily in the clothing sector. Irving Cutler wrote that the Jews in the Maxwell Street area "created a community with some resemblance to the Old World shtetl with its numerous Jewish institutions".

By 1910 Eastern European Jews were moving to new communities due to educational opportunities and income from entrepreneurial activities. The largest group went to the west side neighborhood of North Lawndale. Other neighborhoods receiving Eastern European Jews included northwestern communities such as Albany Park, Humboldt Park, and Logan Square. Northern communities along the lake receiving Eastern European Jews included Lake View, Rogers Park, and Uptown. A group of Eastern European Jews moved into the German Jewish community on the South Side of Chicago.

Post-1945 and Suburbanization
In the post-World War I era a group of Jews, mostly consisting of wealthy descendants of immigrants from Germany, settled in the exclusive North Shore suburbs of Chicago, including Glencoe and Highland Park.

There were 275,000 Jews in Chicago by 1930, making it the third largest Jewish population after New York City and Warsaw. In that year, 80% of Chicago's Jews were of Eastern European heritage. The Chicago Jews were 8% of the city's population.

In 1950, 5% of the Chicago area Jews lived in suburbs. As part of the first wave of suburbanization, in the early 1950s Jews began moving to Lincolnwood and Skokie because of white flight, relatively inexpensive vacant land, and the 1951 opening of the Edens Expressway. Homebuilders, often Jewish homebuilders who advertised to Jewish communities, constructed single family houses in Skokie and Lincolnwood. Ultimately most northern suburbs were settled by Jews except those which Jews were barred from: Kenilworth and Lake Forest had prevented Jews from moving in. The number of Jews in the suburbs increased to 40% by the early 1960s.

Jewish movement to the Cook County suburbs of the Calumet Region began in the late 1940s with the development of Park Forest, Illinois. By the 1970s, Jews were also living in the nearby suburbs of Homewood, Flossmoor, Olympia Fields, and Glenwood. In recent decades, this community has grown smaller due to, among other factors, white flight and its isolation from most other Jewish communities in Chicagoland. Only one synagogue remains in this region, Shir Tikvah of Homewood. 

Movement of Jews within the city was also occurring in the 1950s. The Jewish population of North Lawndale shrunk from almost 65,000 in 1946 to around 500 in 1956 due to white flight and the ensuing mass disinvestment of Jewish institutions from the neighborhood. A 1951 University of Chicago study made the following community area Jewish population estimates:

 North Lawndale - 42,300
 Albany Park - 26,400
 Rogers Park - 18,400
 South Shore - 17,800
 Uptown/Edgewater - 16,400
 Lakeview - 16,100
 Hyde Park - 14,700
 West Town/Humboldt Park - 11,400
 West Ridge (West Rogers Park) - 11,200
 Austin - 7,400
 Logan Square - 6,700
 North Center/Irving Park/Avondale - 6,500
 East Garfield Park - 5,600
 West Garfield Park - 5,300
 Chatham/Avalon Park/South Chicago - 5,300
 Kenwood - 5,300
 Near North Side/Lincoln Park - 5,000
 North Park - 3,700
 West Lawn/Chicago Lawn (Marquette Park)/West Englewood - 3,500
 Englewood/Greater Grand Crossing - 2,800
 Lincoln Square - 2,100
 Woodlawn - 1,900

In the 1950s, South Side Jewish communities also formed in Jeffery Manor, Beverly, and Calumet Heights. A rapid exodus of Jews from the South Side began in the 1960s due to white flight. By the mid-1970s, Kenwood and Hyde Park were the only South Side neighborhood with large Jewish populations, although synagogues continued to operate in South Chicago and Marquette Park. 

A 1982 study found there were about 248,000 Jews in the Chicago metropolitan area, making up about 4% of the population. By this time, the Jewish communities on the west and northwest sides of the city had almost completely disappeared. The city neighborhoods with the highest percentage of Jewish residents in 1982 were West Rogers Park and North Park. Outside of these neighborhoods, the vast majority of Jews who remained in the city lived in the lakefront neighborhoods north of the Loop. A smaller, but still sizable community, remained in Kenwood-Hyde Park. A small, shrinking, mostly elderly community remained in Albany Park, which only a few decades before had been one of the largest Jewish neighborhoods in the Midwest.

The 1982 study also noted the suburbs with the highest percentage of Jewish residents were Skokie, Lincolnwood, Bannockburn, Deerfield, Highland Park, Glencoe, and Buffalo Grove. Jewish suburban populations also existed in Des Plaines, Evanston, Glenview, Morton Grove, Niles, Northbrook, Wheeling, and Wilmette.

In the latter half of the 20th century, the Jewish population in Chicagoland declined due to declining Jewish immigration, lower birth rates, intermarriage, and younger generations feeling alienated from the community. Assimilation became more widespread, which led to the decline of Yiddish being spoken in the Jewish community.

Present Day
In 2020 there are reported to be 319,600 Jewish people living in Cook, DuPage, Kane, Lake, McHenry and Will Counties—about 3.8% of the metro population. These residents are spread out among a total of 175,800 households with an additional 100,700 non-Jewish people living in these Jewish households.

According to the study, approximately 37% of Chicago-area Jews live within city limits, 34% in North suburbs, 18% in the Northwest suburbs, 8% in West suburbs, and 3% in South suburbs. 

Reform and Conservative synagogues have continued to shrink and close while Jewish organizations including The Rohr Jewish Learning Institute aim to make Judaism relevant to the community.

Geography

In 1995, of the 248,000 Jews living in Chicago area, over 80% lived north of Lawrence Avenue (4800 north) and over 62% of the entire population of Chicago area Jews lived in suburban communities. Glencoe, Highland Park, Lincolnwood, and Skokie had estimates of being almost 50% Jewish. Buffalo Grove and Deerfield had estimates of being over 25% Jewish. Evanston, Glenview, Morton Grove, Niles, Northbrook, Wilmette, and Winnetka had estimates of being 10-25% Jewish. Young Jewish families were moving to the Far Northwest Suburbs. The suburban Jewish population "continues to be dispersed over a widening geographic area" which hampers the ability to supply certain Jewish-oriented services. Cutler wrote that inter-suburban movement was occurring among Jews.

In 1995 Irving Cutler wrote that the Jewish populations of Deerfield and Northbrook had recent growth, and he also stated that the Jewish community of Buffalo Grove was "large and growing". The Jewish Federation of Metropolitan Chicago estimated in 1975 that of the almost 70,000 residents in Skokie, Jewish people made up 40,000 of them. In 1995 Irving Cutler wrote that there had been a recent decline of Jews in Skokie due to children of post-World War II households growing up and moving out, and that there had especially been inter-suburban movement of Jews from Skokie.

In 1995, 85,000 Jews lived in the City of Chicago, with 80,000 of them living in contiguous Jewish communities within the city and in a series of northside lakefront communities. The contiguous Jewish communities included West Rogers Park/West Ridge and the lakefront area ranges from the Chicago Loop to Rogers Park. In that year, the Hyde Park-Kenwood area has a population of Jews. In 1995 Cutler wrote that in the city the Jewish population was being concentrated in fewer and fewer neighborhoods.

Irving Cutler, author of the article "The Jews of Chicago: From Shtetl to Suburb," stated that Jews living in southern and western suburbs of Chicago and in Northwest Indiana "often feel removed from the mainstream of Chicago Jewry" since they do not have Jewish services and have smaller numbers than the main group of Jews to the north. In 1995, the Oak Park-River Forest-Westchester area to the west had a Jewish community. In the same year, the Glenwood-Homewood-Flossmoor-Olympia Fields-Park Forest area to the south had another Jewish community. In 1995, some Northwest Indiana cities such as East Chicago, Hammond, and Michigan City had Jewish populations in 1996; Cutler stated that the Northwest Indiana Jewish populations were "small and often declining".

Institutions

The United Hebrew Relief Association (UHRA) was founded in 1859. Fifteen Jewish organizations, including some B'nai B'rith lodges and some women's organizations, together founded the UHRA.

The earlier German Jewish community founded many institutions to deliver services to its people. These include the following: The Michael Reese Hospital was founded in 1882; The Drexel Home, a home for elderly Jews, was founded in 1891 at 62nd St. and Drexel Ave; The Standard Club, a civic and social club, located at 320 S. Plymouth Ct., was opened in 1869. The Eastern European Jews founded the Jewish Training School in 1890, the Chicago Maternity Center in 1895, and the Chicago Hebrew Institute in 1903.

In 1900, BMZ-Beth Moshev Z'elohim (Orthodox Jewish Home for the Aged), located at 1648 S. Albany Ave. in North Lawndale, is founded and opens its doors to 15 residents in 1903.

In 1968, a study was conducted and the Gerontological Council of the JF was established. In 1971, The Council for Jewish Elderly, later renamed to become CJE SeniorLife, was founded by the Jewish Federation to provide services to elderly Jews in their residences and provide housing. 

The Illinois Holocaust Museum and Education Center is located in Skokie.

Education
In 1995 Jews in Chicago attend universities at twice the rate of the overall population, and this contributes to the overall higher than average incomes.

Spertus Institute for Jewish Learning and Leadership is located in Chicago.

Universities include:
 Hebrew Theological College

Primary and secondary schools:
 Akiba-Schechter Jewish Day School
 Bernard Zell Anshe Emet Day School
 Chicago Jewish Day School
 Fasman Yeshiva High School
 Ida Crown Jewish Academy
 Rochelle Zell Jewish High School (former Chicagoland Jewish High School)
 Telshe Yeshiva

There is also a museum, Illinois Holocaust Museum and Education Center.

Congregations
The first synagogue in Chicago was the Kehilath Anshe Mayriv (KAM), located at the intersection of Lake and Wells. German Jewish immigrants founded it in 1847. Kehilath B'nai Sholom, the second congregation, was founded by 20 Polish Jews in 1852 who dissatisfied with KAM. Kehilath B'nai Shalom was more Orthodox than KAM. In 1861 the Sinai Reform Congregation formed, using a church near the intersection of LaSalle and Monroe as its place of worship. The founders were a group of former KAM members with Rabbi Bernhard Felsenthal as the leader.

In 1920 a synagogue opened in Glencoe. This synagogue, the first synagogue in the North Shore, was a branch of the Sinai Congregation (Reform) of the South Side and eventually became the North Shore Congregation Israel, an independent synagogue. In 1952 the first synagogue serving Lincolnwood and Skokie, the Niles Township Jewish Congregation, opened.

In 1995, there were about 24 Jewish congregations in Lincolnwood and Skokie. Most of them are Conservative or Orthodox-Traditional synagogues. One rabbinical college is in Skokie. In 1995 the North Shore suburbs further from the Chicago Loop have mostly Reform congregations. In the same year, the following further-out suburbs with newer Jewish settlement have synagogues: Buffalo Grove, Des Plaines (now closed), Hoffman Estates, Vernon Hills, and Wheeling. In that year, six synagogues were in the area around Buffalo Grove. West Rogers Park had a larger group of Orthodox synagogues.

The majority of synagogues that remain in the city of Chicago are Orthodox and concentrated in West Rogers Park. There are three Conservative synagogues within city limits: Central Synagogue in the Loop (formerly the South Side Hebrew Congregation of South Shore until the 1970s), Congregation Rodfei Zedek in East Hyde Park, and Anshe Emet in Lakeview. There are four Reform synagogues within city limits: Temple Sinai on the Near North Side (formerly in East Hyde Park until the 1990s), Emanuel Congregation in Edgewater, Temple Sholom in Lakeview, and KAM Isaiah Israel in Kenwood.

Notable Jews of metropolitan Chicago

References
 Cutler, Irving. "The Jews of Chicago: From Shtetl to Suburb" (Chapter 5). In: Holli, Melvin G. and Peter d'Alroy Jones. Ethnic Chicago: A Multicultural Portrait. Wm. B. Eerdmans Publishing, 1995. Start page 122. , 9780802870537.

Notes

Further reading
 Bregstone, Philip P. Chicago and Its Jews: A Cultural History. Philip P. Bregstone, 1933.
 Brinkmann, Tobias. "Sundays at Sinai" A Jewish Congregation in Chicago. Chicago: University of Chicago Press, 2012. .
 Chicago Jewish History. Chicago: Chicago Jewish Historical Society, 1989—current.
 Chicago Sinai Congregation: A Pictorial History. Chicago: Chicago Sinai Congregation, 1986.
 Cutler, Irving. The Jews of Chicago: From Shtetl to Suburb. University of Illinois Press, 1996. , 9780252021855. 
 Cutler, Irving. Chicago's Jewish West Side. Arcadia Publishing, 2009. , 9780738560151.
 Cutler, Irving. Jewish Chicago: A Pictorial History. Arcadia Publishing, 2000. , 9780738501307.
 Meites, Hyman Louis (editor). History of the Jews of Chicago. Chicago Jewish Historical Society, 1924. , 9780922984046. 1990 reprint available.
 Rosen, Rhoda (editor). The Shaping of a Community: The Jewish Federation of Metropolitan Chicago. Chicago: Spertus Press, 1999.
 Roth, Walter. Looking Backward: True Stories from Chicago's Jewish Past. Academy Chicago Publishers, Limited, 2005. , 9780897335409.
 The Sentinel's History of Chicago Jewry, 1911–1986. Chicago: Sentinel Pub. Co., 1986.
 Synagogues of Chicago. Chicago: Chicago Jewish Historical Society, 1991.

External links
 Jewish United Fund/Jewish Federation of Metropolitan Chicago
 "Chicago Jewish History." Spertus.
 Russian-Jews on Maxwell Street, University of Illinois Chicago 

Demographics of Chicago
Chicago
Jewish
Chicago